Shubharambh ( Auspicious beginning) is an Indian Hindi-language romantic action drama thriller television series. Produced by Shashi Sumeet Productions, it aired from 2 December 2019 to 13 November 2020 on Colors TV.  It starred Mahima Makwana and Akshit Sukhija in the lead roles. The show was developed and written by Pankhuri Gangwal and Vaishali Naik.

Plot

Raja Reshammiya, a son of his wealthy family lacks self-confidence. Sharp and pretty, Rani Dave hails from a poor family. They meet and fall in love. Thinking the Daves are rich, Raja's mom Asha sends a marriage proposal. After the marriage, Asha finds out Rani is poor.

Later on, Rani and Raja come up with several situations, and Raja's uncle and aunt want them to be under their control. Meanwhile, Kesha (Raja's uncle and Aunt's daughter) falls for Ustav's Boss, and decides to marry him without informing her family. She was pregnant. Later on, Utsav reveals the truth of his boss to Kesha. His boss was already married. Heartbroken, Kesha comes back home with Utsav's advice. With misunderstanding, the family blames Utsav, except Rani. When she enquires Utsav, he agreed the blame. Kesha's father decides that she must leave the house as she did not obey his wish for her marriage with his business friend, Mukesh Shah's son. After that, Raja and Rani participate in a competition of shoemakers called 'Mera Jutha hai Hindustani' as the winner of the competition gets a loan from the government to start their shoe factory. They both fail in the selection round. So, they decided to go with the wild card entry and along with them Kesha participates, as she had a deal with her father that if Raja and Rani were out of the competition, she can come home. So, with Utsav's trust she goes to competition. Meanwhile, Raja gets badly injured in the eye while he makes the soles of the shoes with a chemical glue. Both Raja and Rani work hard to win the competition as a false statement was given for not attending the interview with their name that they will be separated if they lose the competition. They work very hard. Competitor Mihika and Kesha tried very hard to make them lose but failed. Kesha fakes her illness and after seeing Raja's kindness, she tells the truth on how she tried to sabotage them. Raja is hurt on his foot and they both try to go to the competition. Raja's uncle and aunt send goons after them. Raja gets injured and tells Rani to go to the competition. Raja and Rani won the competition.
As Raja gets injured due to Gunvant's evil plot Rani's ex-lover Mihir enter their life as his doctor much to her dismay. Mihir blackmails her to marry him and he will save Raja. A helpless Rani agrees. After Raja's second surgery, Rani tells the family the truth. She decided to commit suicide by drinking poison. Mihir sees how much Rani loves Raja and leaves Rani. Raja is recovered.

One year later
Raja and Rani have become very successful. Raja's uncle and aunt want to kill Rani. His uncle decides to lit them on fire, but instead both him and his wife are caught in the circle of fire. Raja and Rani jump in the circle trying to save them. His uncle and aunt gives the keys of his father's shop to Raja and Rani. And finally, the family reunites and takes a family selfie together.

Cast

Main
 Akshit Sukhija as Raja Reshammiya: Asha and Dhanwant's son; Gunwant and Kirtida's paternal nephew; Hitendra, Mehul and Keshavi's cousin; Vrinda and Chagan's son-in-law; Rani's husband (2019−2020)
 Mahima Makwana as Rani Dave/Rani Raja Reshammiya: Vrinda and Chagan's daughter; Utsav and Vandita's sister; Asha and Dhanwant's daughter-in-law; Raja's wife (2019–2020)
 Jiten Lalwani as Gunwant Reshammiya: Dhanwant's younger brother; Kirtida's husband; Hitendra, Mehul and Keshavi's father; Raja's cunning paternal uncle (2019−2020)
 Chhaya Vora as Kirtida Gunwant Reshammiya: Gunwant's wife; Hitendra, Mehul and Keshavi's mother; Raja's cunning paternal aunt (2019−2020)

Recurring
 Pallavi Rao as Asha Dhanwant Reshammiya: Dhanwant's wife; Raja's mother; Rani's mother-in-law (2019−2020)
 Rakesh Kukreti as Dhanwant Reshammiya: Gunwant's elder brother; Asha's husband; Raja's father; Rani's father-in-law (2019) (Dead)
 Padmesh Pandit as Chagan Dave: Vrinda's husband; Utsav, Vandita and Rani's father (2019–2020)
 Shubhangi Latkar/Vaishnavi Mahant as Vrinda Chagan Dave: Chagan's wife; Utsav, Vandita and Rani's mother (2019−2020)/(2020)
 Meghan Jadhav as Utsav Dave: Vandita and Rani's brother; Raja's brother-in-law; Keshavi's husband (2019−2020)
 Vaidehi Dharmecha as Vandita Dave/Vandita Mahendra Shah/Chukki: Utsav and Rani's sister; Mahendra's wife; Raja's sister-in-law (2019–2020)
 Rahul Patel as Mahendra Shah/Popat: Vandita's husband (2019–2020)
 Vikas Tripathi/Meer Ali as Hitendra Reshammiya/Hitank: Gunwant and Kirtida's eldest son; Mehul and Keshavi's brother; Raja's cousin brother; Darshan's husband (2019–2020)/(2020)
 Dipna Patel/Zalak Desai as Darshana Hitendra Reshammiya: Hitendra's wife; Gunwant and Kirtida's daughter-in-law (2019−2020)/(2020)
 Aarjav Trivedi as Mehul Reshammiya: Gunwant and Kirtida's son; Hitendra and Keshavi's brother; Raja's cousin brother; Jharna's husband (2019−2020)
 Astha Agarwal as Jharna Mehul Reshammiya: Mehul's wife; Gunwant and Kirtida's daughter-in-law (2019−2020)
 Vaibhavi Mahajan as Keshavi Reshammiya/Keshavi Utsav Dave/Kesha: Gunwant and Kirtida's daughter; Hitendra and Mehul's sister; Raja's cousin sister; Utsav's wife (2019−2020)
 Roopa Divetia as Sharmini Balwant Reshammiya (2019–2020)
 Karan Mehra as Bharat Hasija: Judge at "Mera Joota Hai Hindustani" competition (2020)
 Deepti Bhatnagar Badoni as Meena Nayak: Judge at "Mera Joota Hai Hindustani" competition (2020)
 Prachi Bohara as Sweety Singhaniya (2020)
 Helly Thakkar as Mihika Raichand (2020)
 Raaj Bhavsar as Aashish Patel (2020)
 Shagun Pandey as Dr. Mihir Doshi: Rani's possessive lover; Raja's doctor (2020)

Production
The production and airing of the show was halted indefinitely in 19 March 2020 due to the COVID-19 outbreak in India. The filming was expected to resume on 1 April 2020 but could not and the series was last broadcast on 1 April 2020 when the remaining episodes were aired. The production resumed on 25 June 2020. Owing the halt, the cast of the series took 25% payment cut for six months.
On 27 September, the shooting halted when Akshit Sukhija tested positive for COVID-19. The storyline was tweaked during Akshit Sukhija break. Akshit Sukhija resumed shooting on 12 October 2020.

Reception

Ratings 
According to BARC ratings, with an impression of 3,539, the show entered the top 20 list in week 49 of 2019. Simultaneously, it has maintained its place in week 1 of 2020 and week 3 of 2020 occupying 19th spot respectively in all India Hindi GEC shows with the ratings of 1.7 and 1.6, respectively.
The ratings kept on fluctuating with a rating of 1.4 however it returned to the top 20 list in week 9, 2020 and continued till week 10 and week 11,2020. In week 12, 2020 the show entered the top 10 chart.

References

External links 
 
 Shubharambh on Voot

2019 Indian television series debuts
Indian drama television series
Television shows set in Mumbai
Shashi Sumeet Productions series